Timothy Miller (born October 10, 1964) is an American filmmaker. He made his feature-film directing debut with Deadpool (2016). He was nominated for the Academy Award for Best Animated Short Film as co-story writer and executive producer of the short animated film Gopher Broke (2004). Miller directed Terminator: Dark Fate (2019), and also designed the title sequences of The Girl with the Dragon Tattoo and Thor: The Dark World. He is the creator, showrunner and producer of the animated anthology series Love, Death & Robots, for which he has received several Primetime Emmy nominations and awards.

Early life 
Miller was born in Fort Washington, Maryland. He studied illustration and animation in college.

Career 
In March 1995, Miller co-founded Blur Studio, a visual effects, animation and design company with David Stinnett and Cat Chapman. Miller and Jeff Fowler were nominated for the Academy Award for Best Animated Short Film in 2005 for the short film Gopher Broke.

In March 2008, Miller was set to produce and direct one of eight animated tales based on the Heavy Metal magazine. David Fincher and Kevin Eastman were also attached to produce and direct a story segment. Miller was set by Legendary Pictures on March 15, 2012 to direct a live-action adaptation of the Warren Ellis comic book series Gravel, from a script by Oliver Butcher and Stephen Cornwell. On November 14, 2012, Sony Pictures set Miller to direct Joe Haldeman's science fiction novella Seasons, which Sebastian Gutierrez was set to adapt and Michael De Luca to produce. Miller and Jeff Fowler are also set to direct and produce the animated film The Goon through their Blur Studio. As of 2018, these films are still in development.

Miller designed the title sequences of the film The Girl with the Dragon Tattoo (2011), and of the film Thor: The Dark World (2013). The latter was completed in 12 weeks and included 75 shots, most of which were computer-generated.

On April 8, 2011, Miller was hired by 20th Century Fox to direct the feature film Deadpool, based on the Marvel Comics character of the same name. It was his directorial debut, and was written by Rhett Reese and Paul Wernick, with Ryan Reynolds starring in the title role. Filming began late March 2015 in Vancouver, and the film was released on February 12, 2016. Miller was set to direct the sequel, Deadpool 2, released in 2018, but he departed the project due to creative differences with Reynolds.

In January 2017, Deadline reported that Miller was in talks with James Cameron to work on and possibly direct a new Terminator film. Skydance Media confirmed in September 2017 that Miller would direct the next Terminator film. The title of the film was officially announced as Terminator: Dark Fate in 2019. During production of the film, when asked about backlash regarding the female main characters, Miller said that Mackenzie Davis's character Grace would "scare the fuck" out of "closet misogynist[s]." Despite decent reviews, the film became a box-office bomb, set to lose upwards of $100 million.

In October 2016, Miller was hired to serve as executive producer for a Sonic the Hedgehog feature film, originally being set to be produced by Sony Pictures, before being acquired by Paramount Pictures. Miller and director Jeff Fowler first created a pitch for a Sonic movie with Ben Schwartz voicing the character. After the movie was green-lighted by Paramount, the two chose to cast Schwartz as the voice of Sonic in the film, having enjoyed his performance in the test reading. The film was released on February 14, 2020, and received a warm critical and commercial reception. Miller returned as executive producer for the film's sequel, released on April 8, 2022.

In mid-2017, Miller was hired to direct an adaptation of William Gibson's 1984 science-fiction novel Neuromancer for Fox, which will be produced by Simon Kinberg.

In January 2023, it was announced Eli Roth's film Borderlands would be going through two weeks of reshoots directed by Miller, due to Roth's participation in Thanksgiving, a slasher film that was initially created by Roth as a parody trailer for Grindhouse but has since been promoted to a feature-length film. While Roth would not be involved with the reshoots for Borderlands, he remains involved with the movie and gave Miller his blessing.

Filmography

Feature films

Short films

Television

Technical credits 
Film

Video games

Accolades

References

External links 

 

1964 births
Living people
American film directors
American film producers
American animated film producers
American male screenwriters
American animators
Primetime Emmy Award winners
Visual effects artists